Xie Jin (21 November 1923 – 18 October 2008) was a Chinese film director. He rose to prominence in 1957, directing the film Woman Basketball Player No. 5, and is considered one of the Third Generation directors of China. Most recently he was known for the direction of The Opium War.

Xie was a popular director amongst the older generations of Chinese, with six of his films being voted Best Picture in the Hundred Flowers Awards. He was the only Chinese director to date to be a member of both the Academy of Motion Picture Arts and Sciences as well as the Directors Guild of America.

Biography

Xie was born in Shangyu, Zhejiang Province. He spent his childhood in his hometown, and attended primary school for one year there. In the 1930s, he moved to Shanghai with his parents and continued his education. In 1938, he followed his father to Hong Kong and studied there for one year. When returning to Shanghai in 1939, Xie enrolled in Daxia Affiliated High School and Jishan High School. In leisure time, Xie took courses at Huaguang Drama School and Jinxing Film Training School. His teachers included Huang Zuolin and Wu Renzhi. Meanwhile, he participated students drama activities led by Yu Ling, and acted as Yue Yun in multi-stage play Yue Yun.

In 1941, Xie enrolled in the play department of Jiang'an National Drama School in Sichuan, and was educated by Cao Yu, Hong Shen, Jiao Juyin, Ma Yanxiang, Chen Liting, among other notable figures. In 1943, he voluntarily ceased his study and started working in China Youth Play Agency in Chongqing, and became stage manager, scenario writer and actor. In 1946, Xie reassumed his study at National Drama School in Nanjing, majoring in directing. In 1948, he entered Datong Film Corporation and became assistant director, and associate director.

After establishment of PRC, Xie enrolled in the research institute of politics of North China Revolutionary University. Later, he became an associate director and a director in Changjiang Film Studio and Shanghai Film Studio.

Xie directed more than 20 films in his career. His debut work, Woman Basketball Player No. 5, was the first colored sports film in PRC, which won the silver prize in 6th International Youth Film Festival in 1957, and the Silver Hat Prize in Mexico International Film Week in 1958. He staged the original production of the Chinese revolutionary opera, On the Docks in the early 1960s and also filmed the story in 1972.

The Red Detachment of Women won the Best Picture and Best Directing of the 1st Hundred Flowers Awards, and it also won the Wanlong Prize of 3rd Asia-Africa Film Festival in 1964.

Two Stage Sisters was released in 1965 and in 1980 won the Sutherland Trophy at the 24th BFI London Film Festival. It also won prizes in Portugal and Manila international film festivals. However, it was attacked in his home country because it “advocated the reconciliation of social classes.”  Xie recalled in the 2002 interview that his parents committed suicide amid the political pressure — his mother jumping off a building and his father overdosing on sleeping pills — and he had to collect their bodies himself.

Jia Zhangke remarked it was still risky for Xie to make films about this traumatic period in the 1980s, which he did, when China had started to open up and implement economic reforms.

On 23 August 2008, Xie Jin's son died of cancer. Two months later, on the morning of 18 October 2008, Xie Jin's body was discovered in his hotel room in Shangyu. Hundreds of celebrities and thousands of other people attended his funeral. After he died, Song Zude, known as the King of Media Hype in mainland China, made a series of derogatory statements about Xie Jin. Millions of people stood against Song Zude in respect of the late Xie Jin.

Filmography

References

External links
 Biography of Xie Jin

Xie Jin at the Chinese Movie Database
Xie Jin at Film Reference
 "Two stage sisters: The blossoming of a revolutionary aesthetic," by Gina Marchetti Jump Cut, no. 34, March, 1989, pp. 95–106

Film directors from Zhejiang
People from Shangyu
1923 births
2008 deaths
Sent-down youths
Chinese film directors
Delegates to the 1st National People's Congress